Salvatore Leopoldo "Leo" Gullotta (born 9 January 1946) is an Italian actor, voice actor, comedian and writer.

Biography 
Born in Catania and the last of six children, Gullotta started his career as an extra in Teatro Massimo Bellini. In his long career as actor, Gullotta has starred in about 100 films and has participated in numerous shows and drama series for television. In 1987 he won his first David di Donatello for Best Supporting Actor for his role in Il Camorrista by Giuseppe Tornatore, and later worked with Tornatore four more times. In 1997 and 2000 he won two more David di Donatello for Best Supporting Actor, for the Maurizio Zaccaro films Il carniere and Un uomo perbene. He has also won two Silver Ribbon for Best supporting Actor, in 1984 for Mi manda Picone by Nanni Loy and in 2001 for Vajont by Renzo Martinelli.

Gullotta has starred in many theatrical plays and dramas, and was part of the theater company "Il Bagaglino". He won the Flaiano Prize as stage actor of the year in 2010. He celebrated fifty years of activity that same year.

Gullotta is also a well known voice actor, among others. He was the Italian voice of Manny in the first three films of the Ice Age film series. He reprised this role in short films and video games. He also dubbed Burt Young in Rocky, Joe Pesci in Once Upon a Time in America, Moonwalker, My Cousin Vinny and The Irishman, and the robot Johnny 5 in Short Circuit. He also became the new Italian voice of Woody Allen after the death of Oreste Lionello in 2009.

In 1998 Gullotta debuted as writer with the book Mille fili d'erba (Di Renzo Editore).

Personal life
Gullotta is openly gay. He did not reveal his sexuality to the public until 1995. In 2019, he married his partner of 32 years. Gullotta is discreet about the details of his husband.

Selected filmography

Lo voglio maschio (1971)
La soldatessa alla visita militare (1977) - Captain Lopez - doctor
Squadra antitruffa (1977) - Tarcisio Pollaroli - aka Er Fibbia
Ride bene... chi ride ultimo (1977) - Ifigenia' (segment "Sedotto e violentato)
Rock 'n' Roll (1978) - Il vigile
Café Express (1980) - Imbastaro
Stark System (1980) - Schioppa
I carabbinieri (1981) - Salvatore Caruso
L'onorevole con l'amante sotto il letto (1981) - Segretaria Sgarbozzi / Onorevole Sgarbozzi
L'esercito più pazzo del mondo (1981) - Trasformista
Teste di quoio (1981) - Carrisi - l'interprete
I carabbimatti (1981) - Carabiniere Pasta
Il paramedico (1982) - Attorney
Spaghetti House (1982) - Salvatore Manzilla
Sturmtruppen 2 (tutti al fronte) (1982) - Recluta
Heads I Win, Tails You Lose (1982) - Walter
Miss Right (1982) - Benito
Where's Picone? (1984) - Sgueglia
Giuseppe Fava: Siciliano come me (1984)
Mezzo destro mezzo sinistro - 2 calciatori senza pallone (1985) - Juan Carlos Fulgencio
Il Bi e il Ba (1986) - Gaetano
The Professor (1986) - comissario Iervolino
Grandi magazzini (1986) - Simoni
Italiani a Rio (1987) - Salvatore Giuffrida
Tango blu (1987) - Fior da Fiore
Animali metropolitani (1987) - Don Michele Amitrano
Cinema Paradiso (1988) - Usher
Operazione pappagallo (1988)
Sinbad of the Seven Seas (1989) - Nadir
Scugnizzi (1989) - Fortunato Assante
L'insegnante di violoncello (1989) - Leo
Everybody's Fine (1990) - Uomo armato sul tetto
Nel giardino delle rose (1990) - Armando
Gole ruggenti (1992) - Edoardo Lasagnetta - scriptwriter
Agnieszka (1992) - Franco
Pacco, doppio pacco e contropaccotto (1993) - Il frodatore fiscale conto terzi
The Escort (1993) - Policeman
Sì!... Ma vogliamo un maschio (1994)
Men Men Men (1995) - Tony
The Star Maker (1995) - Vito
Selvaggi (1995) - Luigi
Snowball (1995) - Sidik
Carogne (1995) - Prandstaller
Bruno Is Waiting on the Car (1996) - Ziino
3 (1996) - Bishop of Pisa
The Game Bag (1997) - Carlo Gabbiadini
Io, tu e tua sorella (1997) - Dr. Fabietti
I corti italiani (1997)
Gli inaffidabili (1997) - Bostik
Simpatici & antipatici (1998) - Gigetto
A Respectable Man (1999) - Giovanni Pandico
Oltremare (1999)
Scarlet Diva (2000) - Dr. Vessi
Territori d'ombra (2001) - Antonio
Vajont (2001) - Mario Pancini
In questo mondo di ladri (2004) - Leonardo
Guardians of the Clouds (2004) - La Rocca
Il cuore nel pozzo (2005, TV movie) - Don Bruno
Incidenti (2005) - Giornalista
Fatti della banda della Magliana (2005) - Il giudice
Monógamo sucesivo (2006)
Baarìa (2009) - Liborio
The Father and the Foreigner (2010) - Santini
Fantasmi al Valle (2012) - Luigi Pirandello
Italo (2014) - Narrator (voice)
It's the Law (2017) - Padre Raffaele
Sono solo fantasmi (2019)
 Framed! A Sicilian Murder Mystery (2022-)

Dubbing roles

Animation
Manny in Ice Age
Manny in Ice Age: The Meltdown
Manny in Ice Age: Dawn of the Dinosaurs
Manny in The Ice Age Adventures of Buck Wild
Mr. Big in Zootopia
Tiger in An American Tail
Hans Blix in Team America: World Police
Yattaran in Space Pirate Captain Harlock

Live action
Frankie Minaldi in Once Upon a Time in America
Frankie Lideo in Moonwalker
Vinny Gambini in My Cousin Vinny
Russell Bufalino in The Irishman
Jerry in To Rome with Love
Murray Schwartz in Fading Gigolo
Sidney Munsinger in Crisis in Six Scenes
Jacquasse la Crasse / Jacques-Henri Jacquard in The Visitors
Asterix in Asterix and Obelix vs. Caesar
Paulie Pennino in Rocky
Sergeant Royko in Blood Bath
Malcolm Stinnett in The Sentinel
Zed McGlunk in Police Academy 2: Their First Assignment
Zed McGlunk in Police Academy 4: Citizens on Patrol
Nighthob in The NeverEnding Story
Johnny 5 in Short Circuit
Nick in The Inglorious Bastards
Lou Friedlander in Slow Dancing in the Big City
Medical Examiner in Tightrope
Christian Reall in Drums Along the Mohawk (1970 redub)
Sandman Williams in The Cotton Club
Eddie's Bodyguard in The Big Sleep
Mac in Local Hero
Salieri's Valet in Amadeus
It-Psammead in Five Children and It
Francis Reggio in Le Boulet
Limbo in Planet of the Apes
Archie in Dr. Dolittle 2
Prophet Jack in Life or Something Like It
Judge in Kiss of Death
Boy Mulcaster in Brideshead Revisited
Inspector in A Pure Formality
Michou in La Crise

References

External links 

 
 
 

1946 births
Living people
Actors from Catania
Writers from Catania
Italian male film actors
Italian male voice actors
Italian male television actors
Italian male stage actors
Italian male comedians
Italian impressionists (entertainers)
David di Donatello winners
Nastro d'Argento winners
Ciak d'oro winners
Italian LGBT comedians
Italian gay writers
Italian gay actors
Gay comedians
Gay memoirists
20th-century Italian LGBT people
21st-century Italian LGBT people
20th-century Italian male actors
21st-century Italian male actors
20th-century Italian male writers
21st-century Italian male writers
20th-century Italian comedians
21st-century Italian comedians